Parthibo is a Bangladeshi pop rock group from Rajshahi, formed in 1995 under the name of IGNEOUS. At that time the band members were Rumon (guitar and vocals), Shubho (drums), Tito (keyboards), with others were the first members of that band. The band was a major hit in the city of Rajshahi, frequently doing live shows in and around the city.

History

Formation (1997-2000) 
	

By the end of 1997, Shubho left the band & had to shift to Dhaka with family. The band got stuck. In 1999, Benson & Hedges Star Search Contest was launched. After receiving the application form as a surprise from Rumon's elder brother in Dhaka, Tito & himself started planning how to go about it. By the time, Rumon & Tito were the left alone members only as all others had quit the band. Shubho was recontacted and Dr. Rubel was being approached as Bassist. He readily accepted. The band was reformed and got into the final fifteen (15) in B&H Star Search Contest consecutively in 1999 & 2000. However, the members got busy with studies and it broke down again by the end of 2000.

Main career (2002-2009) 
In 2002, Rumon, inspired by Tito, participated as a solo contestant in the B&H Star Search 2002. This time, Rumon won two awards (Best Solo Performer & Best Lyricist) for the first time in the history of the much evaluated musical talent hunt competition ever! With Shubho on Drums again & Raja on Bass, Rumon & Tito completed the set of musicians on stage for that win.

Right after the awards, Rumon proposed to reform the band with a new name, rather than going solo. This is when PARTHIBO was born. With the earlier four of Rumon, Tito, Raja & Shubho; an additional guitarist was taken in- Sohel.

Time moved on and PARTHIBO steadily grew in shows in Dhaka, doing concerts almost everywhere with the bigger bands. They also participated in the biggest ever concert in the countries history- 'Ampfest' and also in prestigious events like 'Ampart', 'Close Up Juke Box', Fantasy Kingdom Live Concerts etc.
The first single of the band- 'Olpo Ektu Akash' featured in the hit album in 2004- 'Swapnochura'. After their first full album, 'Baundule' got released in 2005, the band was well hailed by the critics and a few of their songs i.e. 'Baundule', 'Grohon', 'Nijhum Raate', 'Olpo Ektu Akash' became quite popular. PARTHIBO won the award of 'Best Band Album' for 'Baundule' in Citycell-Channel I Music Awards 2005 competing with much bigger & famous names.

Meanwhile, PARTHIBO's presence & popularity in the party scene (Parties with English Cover Nos) grew geometrically. They were hitting the floors in embassies, clubs, hotels frequently. This is when the band also got focused into the party scene and from 2006 till 2011, the band was almost completely into the party scene. By this time, Tito had left the band in 2007 for personal reasons and Nabil took his place. also there have been an inclusion of a female artist into the band keeping in mind the requirement of the party sector. Shehrina Kamal, been the first one in 2005. She was with the band till 2008 till she had to leave the country. Neda Shakiba joined in and continued till 2011. During this time, PARTHIBO was everywhere in the Party Scene. They also crossed the border and performed at 'Calcutta Rowing Club' in 2009.

Outgrowth (2011-present) 

In 2011, the band released their second album 'Utshorgo Nijeke'. After this, a major nonnegotiable issue was confronted within the band on the future direction as well as musical taste and Nabil & Neda departed.

Rony joined in 2011 with a fresh air into the band and the band found 'just the person' they were looking for in him. With his well known musical capabilities, he has contributed a lot in a significant improvement in the band's overall sound.

Later, Raja left the band in 2013 and John Sutton Munshi came in his place as a guest bassist. The band ever since has been like a family and built up a greater respect within the music industry.

PARTHIBO's search for a permanent bassist ended when MG Kibria joined the band in the first quarter of 2016. His groovy playing with Technical expertise on the recordings has given the band the much needed thrust to produce their own songs.

Rauma has usually been the female voice as a guest vocal when needed.

Parthibo launched their third album, Parthibo The Definitive Album, on 25 June 2014. The dual CD album contains 10 rearranged hits from their past albums and 10 brand new songs.

In 2016, PARTHIBO released their fourth album- 'Swagoto Bangladeshe' - an album dedicated to the motherland Bangladesh. This album is a beautiful portrait of this country covering its tourism, rich history, festivals, even sports! An album that will make any Bangladeshi feel proud.

PARTHIBO vows to continue its flow of good music in the coming days!

Members 
Current members
 Ashfaqul Bari Rumon – vocals, guitar
 Tanbeer Dawood Rony – keyboards, vocals
 Sudipta Bardhan Shubho – drums, percussion
 M G Kibria - bass

Guest musicians
 John Sutton Munshi - bass
 Selim Haider - guitar

Discography

Albums
 Baundule (Arshee - 2005)
 Utshorgo Nijeke (G-Series - 2011)
 Parthibo The Definitive Album (2014)
 Swagoto Bangladesh (2016)

Guest appearances
 Shopnochura (G-Series - 2005)
 Onno Rokom (Impress - 2007)
 Radio Mania 2 (Ektaar - 2008)
 Rocoholic

Awards 

 Bast Solo Performer and Best Lyricist - Benson & Hedges Star Search 2002 (Rumon)
 Best Keyboardist - Benson & Hedges Star Search 2003 (Rony)
 Best Band - Citycell-Channel i Music Awards 2005
 Best Band - Channel i Music Awards 2017

References 

1998 establishments in Bangladesh